Cnephasia incertana, the light grey tortrix, is a moth of the family Tortricidae. It is found all over Europe.

The wingspan is 14–18 mm.

Adults are on wing from June to July.

The larvae feed on a wide range of herbaceous plants such as Sison amomum, Plantago, and Rumex.

References

External links
UKmoths

incertana
Moths of Europe
Moths described in 1835